Chalice is a Jamaican reggae band formed in 1980 in Gibraltar Hill, St. Mary. Chalice is probably best known for their performances at the Reggae Sunsplash music festival.

Biography
The band was formed in 1980, taking its name from a smoking pipe By 1981 they were a local success and in 1982 their debut album, Blasted, spawned two hit singles in Jamaica. "I Still Love You" stayed at number one for seven weeks, and "Good To Be There" broke the Top 10 the following year.

Their second album, Standard Procedure, was also popular with the singles "I'm Trying" and "Cant Dub". For three years Chalice toured Europe, but they never became as popular in there as in their homeland. A third album, Stand Up was released and scored another hit in Jamaica with the single, "Dangerous Disturbances". When problems put an end to their period in Europe, they turned their attention to the United States and Mexico, and released their album, Crossfire. In Jamaica the song "Revival Time" was a number one hit, but in the United States the song was not as popular. In 1988 they returned to Africa and went back to the United States, where they released their album, Catch It.

From 1989 to 1990 Chalice toured Mexico, and in 1990 their sixth album, Si Mi Ya was released. In December 1990 they were invited to headline the first Mexico Sunsplash. In 1991 a major change took place in the band, when drummer Phanso Wilson and the late lead singer Trevor Roper migrated to the United States. Roper was replaced by Dean Stephens and Wilson by Wayne 'C Sharp' Clarke. Their seventh album, Tuff Enuff was released only in Austria. In 1996 they disbanded.

Original Keyboarder Michael Wallace was killed 1999.

Chalice regrouped in 2006, ten years after their last performance at Reggae Sumfest. They returned to the stage in 2007 for the Symphony Under The Stars Concert in Jamaica. Since then, they have headlined events such as Air Jamaica Jazz & Blues Festival, Rebel Salute, Calabash Festival as well as events in Miami, Fl and The Cayman Islands among many other concerts. They returned in 2011 as the closing act for one of Jamaica's best known festivals – Reggae Sumfest.

Chalice released Let It Play (Tad's Records), in October 2010, Let It Play is the group's first studio album in over 10 years.

Original Lead singer and guitarist Trevor Roper died after battling cancer in Chicago in 2013. Founder Robbie Peart died on 4 August 2015, aged 61.

As of 2018, the band comprised original members Wayne Armond (vocals/guitar), Winston "Alla" Lloyd (keyboards), and Keith "Papa Keith" Francis (bass guitar), along with Dean Stephens (lead vocals), Wayne "C-Sharp" Clarke (drums), Andrew "Preggs" Thompson (electronic percussion), and Jerome Tulloch (keyboards), with drummer Desi Jones an occasional member.

Band members

Present
Dean Stephens (lead vocals)
Wayne Armond (guitar, vocals)
Donald Waugh (lead guitar)
Ervin 'Alla' Lloyd (keyboards, vocals)
Jerome Tulloch (keyboards)
Wayne "C-Sharp" Clarke (drums)
'Papa' Keith Francis (bass)

Past members
Trevor "Oswald" Roper (lead vocals)
Michael Wallace (Keyboards)
Patrick Anderson (drums)
Phanso Wilson (drums)
Robbie Peart (founder)
Steve Golding (lead guitar)
Demar Gayle (keyboards)
Desi Jones (drums)

Discography

Albums

1982: Blasted (Pipe Music)
1983: Standard Procedure (Pipe Music)
1984: Stan' Up (Pipe Music)
1984: Good To Be There (Ariola)
1985: Catch It (Fonarte Latino) & (Rohit)
1986: Crossfire (Techniques)
1990: Si Mi Ya (Peace Pipe Records)
1998: Tuff Enuff (Austria Release)
2010: Let It Play (Tad's Records) ***#10 New York Top 20 Reggae Albums

Singles
1984: "I'm Trying" (Ariola)
1984: "Funny Kinda Reggae" (Ariola)
1985: "Wicked Intention" (Pipe Music)
2008: "Good To Be There ft. Taurus Riley" (Cannon)
2011: "Walking To Somalia" (Chalice Records/Skinny Bwoy Jamaica)
2012: "Our Anniversary" (Chalice Records/Skinny Bwoy Jamaica)

Compilation appearances
1985: The Complete Reggae Music Album (Arcade) 
1987: Romantic Nights – "I Never Knew Love" (CSA) Romantic Nights Roots Archives Listing.
1996: Fire on the Mountain: Reggae Celebrates The Grateful Dead – "Fire On The Mountain" Pow Wow 
1997: Jamaica Ska – Kore – "Hit You Like A Bomb" (Dressed To Kill) 
1997: The Best of the Vintage – The Original Singers – "Good To Be There" (Joe Gibbs) The Best Of the Vintage – The Original Singers Roots Archives Listing
1997: Reggae For Lovers – "I Never Knew Love" (Hallmark)  Reggae For Lovers Roots Archives Listing
1998: The Complete UK Upsetter Singles Collection Vol 4 – "He Who Feels It – Prince Tallis & Chalice" (Trojan)  The Complete UK Upsetter Singles Collection Vol 4 Roots Archive Listing
1999: Reggae – "Shine On" Radio Star Records 
2002: Blowin' In The Wind: Reggae Tribute To Bob Dylan – "Lay Lady Lay" (Madacy Entertainment Group)  Blowin' In The Wind Rhapsody Listing
2002: The Tide Is High: A Tribute To Rock N' Roll – "Master Blaster" (Madacy Entertainment Group) The Tide Is High Rhapsody Listing
2002: Here Comes The Sun: A Reggae Tribute To The Beatles – "Imagine" (Madacy Entertainment Group)  Here Comes The Sun: A Reggae Tribute To The Beatles Amazon Listing
2002: Paint It Black: A Reggae Tribute... – "Paint it Black" (Madacy Entertainment Group)
2004: Trojan RAS Reggae Box Set – "Stand Up" (Trojan)  Trojan RAS Reggae Box Set Roots Archives Listing
2004: 20 Best of Reggae – "Lay Lady Lay" (Madacy Entertainment Group) 20 Best of Reggae Rhapsody Listing
2005: Ultimate Reggae – "Lay Lady Lay" & "Master Blaster" (Madacy Entertainment Group) The Ultimate Reggae Rhapsody Listing
2006: The Stars of Reggae Sunsplash – "Ital Love – Live" (Charly Records) The Stars of Reggae Sunsplash Rhapsody Listing
2006: World Classics: Ital Love – "Revival Time Live" & "Ital Love Live" (Charly Records) World Classics: Ital Love Rhapsody Listing
2006: 15 Crucial Reggae Cuts – "Hit You Like A Bomb" & Stan Up" (Charly Records) 15 Crucial Reggae Cuts Rhapsody Listing
2008: Joe Gibbs Scorchers From The Mighty Two – "Good To Be There" (VP Records) Joe Gibbs Scorchers From The Mighty Two Roots Archives Listing
2009: Dub Like An Antelope – Legends of Reggae Celebrate Phish – "Bouncing Around the Room ft. Yellow Man" (Red Hillz Music) Dub Like An Antelope Rhapsody Listing
2009: Joe Gibbs 12" Reggae Discomix Showcase Vol.2 – "Good To Be There" (17 North Parade) 
2010: Out Here in the Fields: Legends of Reggae Celebrate the Who – "Who Are You" (Red Hillz Music) Out Here in the Fields Rhapsody Listing
2010: Rock on Reggae – "Imagine" (R.B. Puddin) Rock On Reggae Rhapsody Listing
2011: Trojan Presents: Dancehall – 40 Sound System Favourites – "Good To Be There" (Spectrum Audio)

References

External links
 Official Facebook Page
 Official Myspace Page
 Official Reverbnation Page
 Official Twitter Account

Jamaican reggae musical groups